Almaș is a commune in Arad County.

Almaș may also refer to the following entities in Romania:

 A village in the commune Gârcina, Neamț County
 Almaș (Barcău), a tributary of the Barcău in Bihor County
 Almaș (Cracău), a tributary of the Cracău in Neamț County
 Almaș (Mureș), a tributary of the Mureș in Hunedoara County
 Almaș (Someș), a tributary of the Someș in Sălaj County
 A tributary of the Crișul Alb in Arad County
 A tributary of the Valea Mare in Arad County
 A tributary of the Șar in Mureș County

See also 
 Almașu (disambiguation)